Kareem Waris Olamilekan, also known as waspaart (born ) is a Nigerian hyperrealism artist and art prodigy.

Biography 
Olamilekan was born 2006/2007. As of 2018 lives with his parent in Lagos and schools at the Ayowole Academy of Art.

He started drawing at the age of 6. On 3 July 2018, in two hours, he drew a hyper-realistic portrait of French President Emmanuel Macron, during the president's visit to the Fela Kuti's New Africa Shrine in Lagos, Nigeria. President Macron was so impressed and touched by Olamilekan's work that he tweeted a short video featuring the young boy drawing. As a result, Olamilekan's work has received international recognition since then.

Awards 

 2019 - He won Taiwan’s 22nd Fervent Global Love of Lives Award.

References

External links

Meet this Hyper Realistic Young African Boy Artist Who Basically Draws Real Life, 2022 video

2006 births
Living people
Hyperrealist artists
21st-century Nigerian artists